Nandasiri Jasentuliyana is a Sri Lankan lawyer. He was the Director of the United Nations Office for Outer Space Affairs and the Deputy Director-General, United Nations Office at Vienna. He was also the President of International Institute of Space Law; Executive Secretary of the UN Conference on Nuclear Energy and UN Conference on the Peaceful Uses of Outer Space.

Jasentuliyana had served as a Political Affairs Officer at Department of Political and Security Council Affairs, United Nations; Member Board of Trustees of the International Space University (ISU); Member Board of Trustees at International Academy of Astronautics (IAA); Member Bureau, International Astronautical Federation (IAF); Member Editorial Board of Journal of Space Policy, UK; Member Editorial Board, Journal of Space Law USA;  Member, Board of Directors of the International Institute of Air and Space Law, Faculty of Law, University of Leiden and Programme Officer, Asia Foundation.

Educated at Richmond College, Galle, he holds advanced degrees in Law and International Relations from the Universities of Ceylon, London and McGill, and is an Attorney-at-Law.  He holds a Masters in Air and Space Law (1965) from McGill University and a diploma from the Academy of International and Comparative Law.

See also

Sarasa News Broadcast
http://njasentuliyana.tripod.com/
Same Sky Different Nights Launch in Los Angeles
http://thuppahi.wordpress.com
Nandasiri Jasentuliyana Keynote Lecture On Space Law
United Nations Office for Outer Space Affairs
International Institute of Law: Biography
International Institute of Law
Sri Lanka Foundation Lifetime Achievement Award

Publications And Reviews

Amazon.com: Books By Dr. Nandasiri Jasentuliyana
http://www.barnesandnoble.com: Books By Dr. Nandasiri Jasentuliyana
http://www.alibris.com/Books By Dr. Nandasiri Jasentuliyana
http://www.goodreads.com: Books By Dr. Nandasiri Jasentuliyana
http://www.dailymirror.lk/opinion/172-opinion/30698-same-sky-different-nights.html
http://www.thesundayleader.lk/2013/06/02/same-sky-different-nights/
https://web.archive.org/web/20141217223646/http://www.sundayobserver.lk/2007/10/21/spe01.asp

Photos
Same Sky Different Nights: Sri Lanka Launch
Same Sky Different Nights: Los Angeles Launch
Chandramohan Felicitation
http://srilankafoundation.org: Gallery

Other Links

International Space University, Board of Advisors
http://www.mcgill.ca/iasl/
European Center for Space Law
http://www.cocosl.com/
http://www.dailynews: true-genius-and-exceptional-human-being
http://richmondcollege.org/literary_works.html
http://richmondcollege.org/famous_alumni.html

References 

Living people
Sinhalese lawyers
Sri Lankan officials of the United Nations
McGill University alumni
Alumni of the University of Ceylon (Colombo)
Alumni of Sri Lanka Law College
Alumni of Richmond College, Galle
Year of birth missing (living people)
McGill University Faculty of Law alumni